Gratton may refer to:

Gratton (surname)
 Gratton, Derbyshire, England
 Gratton, former settlement in Devon, England

See also
 Graton (disambiguation)